This is the List of municipalities in Çorum Province, Turkey .

References 

Geography of Çorum Province
Corum